Negra Li (born Liliane de Carvalho, São Paulo, September 17, 1979) is a Brazilian singer, actress and dancer. She was one of the lead actresses in the 2006 musical drama film Antônia. She has sold over 300,000 copies and her net worth is R$ 3 million.

In 2016 Negra Li released a single called "Sunshine" featuring her husband Jr. Dread, the song was written and produced by Jamaican producer Adrian "Donsome" Hanson for Donsome Records.

In 2022, she performed cosplayed as a peacock in the reality singing competition The Masked Singer Brasil.

Discography

Albums

Singles

References

1979 births
Living people
Brazilian actresses
Brazilian hip hop musicians
21st-century Brazilian women singers
21st-century Brazilian singers
Brazilian women rappers
Singers from São Paulo